Mohamed bin Ahmed Al-Hajri, sometimes spelled Muḥammad ibn Aḥmad Hajrī, (1889 –1960) was a Yemeni historian, genealogist and judge. He wrote books on Yemeni history and tribes.

Works 

 Majmūʻ buldān al-Yaman wa-qabāʾilihā, 3 volumes, مجموع بلدان اليمن وقبائلها 
 Summary of the History of Yemen, 2007
 Mosques of Sanaa

References 

1889 births
20th-century Yemeni historians
20th-century Yemeni writers
1960 deaths
Yemeni genealogists